Namdaemun is Korean for "South Grand Gate" and may refer to:

Gates

 Namdaemun, a historic gate in Seoul, South Korea, officially known as Sungnyemun.
 2008 Namdaemun fire, a fire which severely damaged Namdaemun Gate in Seoul. 
 Namdaemun (Kaesong), a historic gate in Kaesong, North Korea.

Other

Namdaemun Market, one of the oldest and largest traditional outdoor markets in South Korea, which is located very near the Namdaemun Gate
Namdaemun Market station, an alternate name for Hoehyeon station, a subway station near Namdaemun Market in Seoul, South Korea
Namdaemun Station, the first Seoul railway station
Namdaemunno, a major thoroughfare in central Seoul, South Korea